On September 18, 2022, 18-year-old Cayler Ellingson was killed in a vehicle-ramming attack around McHenry, North Dakota. After he was struck by a Ford Explorer SUV driven by a 41-year-old man, Shannon Brandt, Ellingson was taken to a hospital in Carrington, where he was pronounced dead.

Brandt called 911.  An initial highway patrol report claimed that Brandt said he attacked Ellingson for being part of a "Republican extremist group". Brandt said that the victim was calling someone else on the phone before he attacked, who was later identified as Ellingson's mother. Brandt reportedly interpreted the call as an attempt to report him to others. According to North Dakota Highway Patrol Capt. Bryan Niewind there was "no evidence" to Brandt's assertions "that this incident involved politics". The 911 transcript includes Brandt saying that Ellingson “was saying something about some Republican extremist group,” and that Brandt feared that Ellingson was calling someone to "take care of him."

A blood test found Brandt's blood alcohol content level was 0.08, above the legal limit for driving.

Arrest and charges
Brandt was charged with vehicular homicide and released on $50,000 bail. However, on September 22, the charges were upgraded to include murder, a class AA felony, the maximum penalty for which is life imprisonment without parole. Foster County, North Dakota State's Attorney Kara Brinster moved that the previous charges, including criminal vehicular homicide, be dismissed. The new charges filed in district court were based on an investigation by the North Dakota Highway Patrol and the state Bureau of Criminal Investigation which included interviews with people involved and an autopsy of the victim.

Reaction from Donald Trump
Former US president Donald Trump criticized the media for allegedly not giving the killing sufficient coverage. In a speech in North Carolina on September 23, Trump stated that "Just recently, a young 18-year-old man from North Dakota … was targeted and killed, run down in cold blood with an SUV by a radical left maniac. This guy ran him down and not one mainstream media network has even mentioned this horrible crime... Think of it the other way. Supposing a mad person ran down somebody on the other side, it would be the biggest story you've ever seen."

See also
 Charlottesville car attack
 Kenosha unrest shooting

References

2022 in North Dakota
September 2022 crimes in the United States
September 2022 events in the United States
Deaths by person in North Dakota
Foster County, North Dakota
Road incident deaths in North Dakota
Vehicular rampage in the United States